Progesterone receptor membrane component 2 (abbreviated PGRMC2) is a protein which is encoded by the PGRMC2 gene. It has been detected in the placenta, liver, and spermatozoa, among other areas.

See also
 PGRMC
 PGRMC1
 Membrane progesterone receptor

References

Receptors